Principles of Mathematical Analysis, colloquially known as "PMA" or "Baby Rudin," is an undergraduate real analysis textbook written by Walter Rudin. Initially published by McGraw Hill in 1953, it is one of the most famous mathematics textbooks ever written, and is renowned for its elegant and concise style of proof.

History 

As a C. L. E. Moore instructor, Rudin taught the real analysis course at MIT in the 1951–1952 academic year. After he commented to W. T. Martin, who served as a consulting editor for McGraw Hill, that there were no textbooks covering the course material in a satisfactory manner, Martin suggested Rudin write one himself. After completing an outline and a sample chapter, he received a contract from McGraw Hill. He completed the manuscript in the spring of 1952, and it was published the year after. Rudin noted that in writing his textbook, his purpose was "to present a beautiful area of [m]athematics in a well-organized readable way, concisely, efficiently, with complete and correct proofs. It was an [a]esthetic pleasure to work on it."

The text was revised twice: first in 1964 (second edition) and then in 1976 (third edition).  It has been translated into several languages, including Russian, Chinese, Spanish, French, German, Italian, Greek, Portuguese, and Polish.

Contents 
Rudin's text was the first modern English text on classical real analysis, and its organization of topics has been frequently imitated. In Chapter 1, he constructs the real and complex numbers and outlines their properties. (In the third edition, the Dedekind cut construction is sent to an appendix for pedagogical reasons.) Chapter 2 discusses the topological properties of the real numbers as a metric space. The rest of the text covers topics such as continuous functions, differentiation, the Riemann–Stieltjes integral, sequences and series of functions (in particular uniform convergence), and outlines examples such as power series, the exponential and logarithmic functions, the fundamental theorem of algebra, and Fourier series. After this single-variable treatment, Rudin goes in detail about real analysis in more than one dimension, with discussion of the implicit and inverse function theorems, differential forms, the generalized Stokes theorem, and the Lebesgue integral.

References

External links 

 Principles of Mathematical Analysis at McGraw-Hill Education
 Supplemental comments and exercises to Chapters 1-7 of Rudin, written by George Bergman

Mathematical analysis
Mathematics textbooks